Ricardo Efrain Thomas Aquino Carballada de Babilon (April 24, 1929 – March 25, 2021), known professionally as Rick Azar, was an American broadcaster who spent 31 years at WKBW-TV in Buffalo, New York.

WKBW-TV career 
Rick Azar began his career at WHLD radio in Niagara Falls in the early 1950s. Prior to coming to WKBW, Azar was an actor and musician in New York City, as well as a staff announcer for NBC in New York, leaving New York City after failing to secure long-term employment there.

Rick Azar was the first voice heard on WKBW-TV on November 30, 1958. The station was located at 1420 Main Street in Buffalo, New York, and the call letters stood for "Well Known Bible Witness".

Azar signed the station on with the words, "Ladies and Gentlemen, WKBW-TV Channel 7 is on-the-air!" The first broadcast on that snowy night was the James Cagney classic film, Yankee Doodle Dandy.

Azar did not become sports director at WKBW until 1965, when the station's original sports director, Stan Barron, was effectively traded to crosstown rival WBEN-TV in exchange for weatherman Tom Jolls, while Irv Weinstein moved over from AM 1520 to become news director. Azar, Jolls and Weinstein held their respective positions until Azar's retirement in June 1989. Azar also hosted Buffalo Bandstand, a local franchising of American Bandstand, and on at least one occasion substitute hosted the national show in place of Dick Clark.

Azar also served as a color analyst on WKBW's (now WWKB) radio broadcast of the Buffalo Bills games, play-by-play man on the Bills preseason games televised on WKBW-TV and an intermission host on Buffalo Sabres hockey games televised in the 1970s on Ch 7. Azar also did basketball play-by-play on St. Bonaventure basketball games on Ch 7 during the Bob Lanier era.

Azar was noted for his tough, blunt personality and willingness to editorialize on-air in an era when sports talk was not yet a developed medium.

Azar denied rumors that he retired from WKBW in 1989 at 60 years old because of the station's change in ownership (from Capital Cities Communications to Queen City Broadcasting) nor any contract-related disputes. He instead stated that, though he was comfortable being in the public spotlight, he did not feel an overwhelming need for it and felt that he retired at the right time. Such was Azar's popularity that one of the sports anchors hired to replace him (the unrelated Jerry Azar) was chosen specifically because his last name was also Azar.

Azar doing radio in North Carolina 
Azar lived in Pinehurst, North Carolina with his wife Edith, and hosted a weekly jazz radio program on WLHC-FM Life 103.1 through at least the late 2000s.

Personal life
Azar was a graduate of St. Joseph's Collegiate Institute and Canisius College; he chose the surname Azar as a nod to his Hispanic ancestry, as many Spaniard names ended with "-azar." His brother, Carlos Carballada, briefly served as interim mayor of Rochester, New York in 2011 and currently serves as Rochester's commissioner of community and economic development. With his wife, he had four children. He spent much of his retirement in Whispering Pines, North Carolina before returning to Buffalo in 2014.

Azar wrote a memoir, "Tales From Azar's Attic".

Azar died March 25, 2021, at age 91 at Millard Fillmore Suburban Hospital in Williamsville, New York, following years of old age-related decline.

References

1929 births
2021 deaths
American radio sports announcers
American television sports announcers
Buffalo Bills announcers
Buffalo Sabres announcers
College basketball announcers in the United States
National Football League announcers
National Hockey League broadcasters
People from Pinehurst, North Carolina
Radio personalities from Buffalo, New York
Television personalities from Buffalo, New York
St. Joseph's Collegiate Institute alumni
Canisius College alumni